Mads Hansen (born September 16, 1978) is a retired Norwegian professional ice hockey player.

Playing career
During the 2005–06 season he enjoyed one of the best performances ever in the Norwegian GET-ligaen for the Storhamar Dragons. Playing on a line with Patrick Yetman he scored a total of 77 points in 49 regular season and playoff games. A performance which earned him a contract with Brynäs of the Swedish SEL.

He also was a regular on Team Norway and has participated in a number of IIHF World Championships.

Career statistics

Regular season and playoffs

International

External links

1978 births
Living people
Ice hockey people from Oslo
Brynäs IF players
Norwegian ice hockey centres
IK Oskarshamn players
Storhamar Dragons players
Vålerenga Ishockey players
Olympic ice hockey players of Norway
Ice hockey players at the 2010 Winter Olympics
Manglerud Star Ishockey players
Ice hockey players at the 2014 Winter Olympics